A blind date is a courtship meeting between unacquainted persons.

Blind Date or Blind Dating may also refer to:

Films 
 Blind Date (1934 film), starring Ann Sothern
 Blind Date (1959 film), directed by Joseph Losey
 Blind Date (1984 film), directed by Nico Mastorakis starring Kirstie Alley
 Blind Date (1987 film), starring Bruce Willis and Kim Basinger
 Blind Date (1996 film), directed by Theo van Gogh
 Blind Date (2007 film), directed by Stanley Tucci
 Blind Date (2015 film), directed by Clovis Cornillac
 Blind Dates, a 2013 Georgian film
 Blind Dating, a 2006 film directed by James Keach

Television

Series
 Blind Date (American game show), an American dating game show
 Blind Date (American TV series), an American dating game show that started airing in 1999
 Blind Date (Australian game show), an Australian television game show
 Blind Date (British game show), a British dating game show
 The Blind Date (TV series), a British crime drama

Episodes
 "Blind Date" (30 Rock), a 2006 episode of the series 30 Rock
 "Blind Date" (Angel), a 2000 episode of the series Angel
 "Blind Date", an episode of the series Roswell

Other uses 
 Blind Date (band), a musical group
 Blind Date, an art piece by John Duncan
 Blind Date, a 1977 novel by Jerzy Kosiński
 Blind Date, a 1986 novel by R. L. Stine
 Blind Date, a 1950 Billboard-charting song sung by Margaret Whiting and Bob Hope.
 Blind Date (radio series), a 1943 - 1946 American radio program

See also
Blind (disambiguation)
Date (disambiguation)
Dating (disambiguation)